Baba Syed Noor Shah Wali (Urdu بابا نور شاہ ولی العربی سرکار) shrine is at Paki Mari near the General Bus Stand of Faisalabad city. It was near the old settlement of Mari-Patan where the shrine of Baba Noor Shah Wali is located. The shrine is around 400 years old and is older than the history of Faisalabad.
 There is a very big graveyard around the shrine.

Baba Noor Shah Wali spread the teaching of Islam in the area of Faisalabad. This shrine is under the management of Punjab Auqaf and Religious Affairs Department.

Urs of Baba Noor Shah Wali Sarkar is celebrated every year in month of July.

See also
Baba Qaim Sain
Baba Lasoori Shah

References

People from Faisalabad
Punjabi Sufi saints
Sufi shrines in Pakistan
Sufism in Pakistan